Taśtaks is an ethnographic group of Polish people, and part of the bigger ethnographic group of the Greater Poland people. They inhabit the rural area around the Warta river near the Nowe Miasto nad Wartą, in the counties of Środa and Września, in the Greater Poland Voivodeship, Poland, notably including the villages of Czeszewo, Krzykosy, Lubrze, Orzechowo, Pięczkowo, and Witowo.

Etymology 
The name comes from the expression taśta, locally used by the population, while calling their horses during the horse riding.

Notes

References 

Lesser Poland
Lechites
Polish people
Slavic ethnic groups
Ethnic groups in Poland
Polish culture
Polish traditions
Greater Poland
Greater Poland Voivodeship